The Central Handley Historic District is located in Handley, Fort Worth, Texas, seven miles east of downtown. The district was the commercial center of the unincorporated small town of Handley (ca. 1910 to 1951) which was subsequently annexed into the city of Fort Worth, Texas in 1946.

Platted in 1885 by the Texas & Pacific Railway, the growth of the town was influenced by the presence of the railroad and the arrival of the Northern Texas Traction Company’s Interurban streetcar system operating between Fort Worth and Dallas in 1902. As the location of the traction company's power plant and car bams, the town became home to employees of both the Northem Texas Traction Company and the T & P.

The Central Handley Historic District was oriented on the north side of the railway reservation with the depot located along the southern border of the district. The businesses within the district served not only the local residents and area farmers but the commuters who traveled on the railroad and the Interurban.

It was named for James Madison Handley, a Georgia native and veteran of the U.S. Civil War.

It was added to the National Register on January 17, 2002.

Photo gallery

See also

National Register of Historic Places listings in Tarrant County, Texas

References

External links

National Register of Historic Places in Fort Worth, Texas
Historic districts in Fort Worth, Texas
Historic districts on the National Register of Historic Places in Texas